Elemental Master is a top down scrolling shooter developed by TechnoSoft for the Sega Genesis and released in 1990 in Japan and in 1993 in North America by Renovation Products.

Gameplay
The game is autoscrolling upwards. The player can choose to either shoot up or down. There are different weapons (types of magic) available, based on (naturally) the elements. Of the seven levels the game has, the player can choose the order of the first four.

Plot
Long ago in the fantasy kingdom of Lorelei, the followers of an evil being called Gyra were sealed underneath the city's castle. However, a seemingly heroic sorcerer known as Aryaag betrayed the king's trust and unleashed the power of Gyra on the kingdom with the intention of letting the evil influence spread. Laden, the strongest sorcerer in the kingdom, was ready to attack Aryaag, but was stopped in shock when Aryaag revealed himself to be Laden's brother Roki. Backed by Gyra's most dedicated followers, Roki banished Laden from the conquered kingdom. However, Laden vows to stop Gyra's influence from spreading and to stop Gyra's ambitions.

Development
The soundtrack was composed by Toshiharu Yamanishi, who also worked on Thunder Force III, Thunder Force IV and Dragon's Fury (one song from Elemental Master was remixed into a new version in Dragon's Fury). The style of the soundtrack is synthrock with classical vibes.

Reception
Illusionware gave it the grade A/92% and stated that "Elemental Master strikes the perfect balance between graphics, music and gameplay" and an "excellent piece of gaming history". Sega-16 writer Benjamin Galway gave the grade 9 out of 10 and hailed the game with the words "It's a terrific, fairly original take on the vertical scrolling shooter and yet another feather in Technosoft's cap".  MegaTech gave the game an overall score of 78/100 stating “A technically superb shoot ‘em up which combines excellent graphics and superb to make it an audio/visual treat. The gameplay is very enjoyable, but the problem is that there are only five levels and they’re not that difficult to beat.” Console XS gave the game an overall score of 81/100, the magazine criticized Elemental Master for having too few levels and saying the levels are easy are conquer, they gave praise to the game's gameplay stating "Involving and very addictive, which can get you completing it again and again."

References

External links
Elemental Master at MobyGames
Elemental Master at GameFAQs

1990 video games
Fantasy video games
Sega Genesis games
Sega Genesis-only games
Shoot 'em ups
Technosoft games
Video games developed in Japan
Single-player video games